The Jameh Mosque of Golpayegan is one of the important mosques of the Seljukid era and one of the large mosques in Iran. In view of its construction date, it may be said that its Iranian Islamic architecture was a model for building other large mosques specially the mosques, which were in the territory of seljukid dynasty. This mosque is located in the Masjed Jameh street in Golpayegan.

Construction date 
The Jameh mosque of Golpayegan was built in 1114 during the reign of the Seljuk Sultan, Abou Shoja Muhammad I. In the past, the exact construction date was unknown, but because of the name of Abou Shoja in the dome inscription, it was estimated that the construction date should be between 1105 and 1118, which was the reign era of Abou Shoja Muhammad I. But later, the archeologists found out by reading the inscription of mihrab that some of inscriptions are under the floor of shabestan. They found the inscriptions in shabestan. The construction date of the mosque was mentioned in the inscriptions and so the exact construction date was revealed.

Architectural features 
The Jameh mosque of Golpayegan was built by order of Abou Nasr Ebrahim ebn-e Mohammad ebn-e Ebrahim Baba Abd ol-Malek. His name was mentioned on two places in the mosque; one on the dome inscription and the other on the margin of mihrab.

The architect of the mosque was Abou Omar ebn-e Mohammad Qazvini, who was an architect from Qazvin. His name was mentioned above the mihrab under the dome inscription in two rows.

Other buildings, on which the name of Sultan Abou Shoja Muhammad I has mentioned are as follows:

 The minaret of Jameh mosque of Saveh (1110 a.d)
 Jameh mosque of Qazvin (1114 a.d.)
 Two chambers in the Great Mosque of Diyarbakır in Turkey (1117 a.d.)
 A wall opposite the shabestan of Umayyad Mosque in Damascus (1109 a.d.)
 
The construction date of Jameh mosque of Golpayegan and the other mosques in Saveh, Qazvin, Turkey and Damascus show that in a short period of time from 1109 until 1117 several mosques have been built in the Seljukid era in the regions very far from each other. This fact shows that governments considered mosques as essential elements for getting legitimacy on one hand and for showing their might and expanse of their territories on the other hand.

In the Fath-Ali Shah's era, the simple shabestans around both sides of the dome and the eastern and western buildings of the mosque were built and added to the Seljukid mosque.

The courtyard of the mosque excluding vestibule, chambers and porticoes has an area of 1600 m². The dome is 22 m high and the inner space of the dome has a dimension of 12 x 12 m.

There is a big shallow howz in the middle of the courtyard.

Like other Seljukid buildings, shabestan has no tile decoration.

Inscriptions 
This mosque has a large courtyard and shabestan and a big brick dome. Having several brick inscriptions and many decorations are distinctive features of this mosque.  The name of Mohammad ebn-e Malek Shah has been mentioned on the kufic inscription of the dome. Around the big mihrab below the dome, there is an inscription, in which the name of the mosque's founder, Abou Nasr ebn-e Mohammad ebn-e Ebrahim, has been written. Also in the several places in the shabestan, the name of religious personalities and some religious sentences has been mentioned in kufic script.

See also 
 List of the historical structures in the Isfahan province

References 

12th-century mosques
Mosques in Isfahan Province
Seljuk architecture
Mosque buildings with domes
National works of Iran